St. Thomas' Girls' High School is a girls' school in Sri Lanka's southernmost district Matara.

History
From the end of 1939 to the end of 1945, Somakumari Samarasinha was principal. She was followed by Mrs. Wijeratna and Mrs. Buddhapriya. They were followed by Mrs. De Silva and Mrs. Bultjens. The school started at a rented house on Main Street, Matara. It was moved to its present location in Walpola in 1950. In 2009, one student died in hospital and 27 others were treated in hospital after they had received a rubella vaccination in the school.

Principals

College houses
 Amethyst: Purple 
 Emerald: Green 
 Ruby: Red 
 Sapphire: Blue

References

External links 

Provincial schools in Sri Lanka
Educational institutions established in 1885
Schools in Matara, Sri Lanka
Girls' schools in Sri Lanka